Kites is a 2010 Indian romantic action thriller film directed by Anurag Basu, with the story written and produced by Rakesh Roshan, starring Hrithik Roshan, Bárbara Mori, Kangana Ranaut, and Kabir Bedi.

Presented in English as Kites: The Remix by Brett Ratner, the film was released in India and in North America on 21 May 2010. Its 208-theater opening in North America made it the largest Bollywood release up to that time. It was also the first Bollywood film to reach the weekend top ten, though My Name is Khan had a larger first-weekend North American gross. Despite a strong opening, the film only managed to collect  net in its lifetime run following a critical loss. Domestically, one of the major criticisms aimed at the film was towards the multilingual narrative that featured the majority of dialogue in English and Spanish, while it was advertised as a Hindi-language film in India.

Plot

Jay Ray (Hrithik Roshan) is a dance teacher in Las Vegas, Nevada. As a sideline, he marries immigrant women to get them green cards in exchange for money. When Gina (Kangana Ranaut), the rich daughter of a powerful Anglo-Indian casino owner Bob Grover (Kabir Bedi), falls for him, Jay goes along to marry into money. He discovers that his future brother-in-law, the vicious, homicidal Tony (Nicholas Brown), is about to marry a Mexican woman named Natasha (Bárbara Mori), whom Jay knows as Linda, the last of the immigrant women he married. On the night before "Natasha" and Tony's wedding, Linda and Jay humorously agree to a "divorce" that night. A jealous, gun-wielding Tony arrives at her apartment while Jay is there. After he hits her, Linda impulsively knocks him out with a heavy object while he tussles with Jay. Linda and Jay go on the run toward Mexico, with Tony and the police in pursuit. They are helped by a friend of Jay, Robin (Anand Tiwari). Robin gives them fake passports and IDs so that they can go wherever they want.

In the following week, Jay and Linda get married in Mexico. On the day of their wedding, they come back to their house. There, Robin comes to give them the passports and is unexpectedly shot by Tony and his men. Linda and Jay escape, but Jay is shot in the process. In a car chase, Linda stops the car at a train, puts Jay aboard it, and drives off. Back to the present, Jay meets with Jamaal, one of Bob's employees, and is ambushed. Jamaal is killed but not before telling Jay of Linda's whereabouts. Jay kills off all of Tony's men and then kills Tony by smashing his face into the car door. He is shot then by Gina. He drives off to the location where Jamaal said Linda was last seen. It is shown that after Jay was put aboard the train, Linda was ambushed on a cliff and sent Jay a text message saying, "I am going...Sorry, Forget me". She drives off of the cliff, killing herself by drowning. Jay cries and then smiles, jumping off the cliff as well. Finally, he is reunited with Linda under the ocean, and they embrace through death.

Cast
Hrithik Roshan as Jai Singhania  
Bárbara Mori as Linda/Natasha
Kangana Ranaut as Gina Grover (credited as special appearance)
Kabir Bedi as Bob Grover
Nicholas Brown as Tony Grover
Anand Tiwari as Robin
Yuri Suri as Jamaal, Bob's family chauffeur
Madhuri Bhatia as Gina's mom
Steven Michael Quezada as a cop
Ronald Robert Hamilton as Railyard Worker
Camme Tyla as News Reporter
Ivan Brutsche as Border Patrol
Luce Rains as Bounty Hunter

Production

Casting
Earlier, actress Sonam Kapoor was offered the female lead, but she rejected the script due to the excessive bold scenes in the film. Later, Deepika Padukone was approached to star opposite Hrithik Roshan, although she also turned down the offer for the same reasons. Barbara Mori was eventually cast as the female lead after much negotiation and script changes.

Pre-release revenues
Kitess worldwide distribution rights were sold for  acquired by Reliance big pictures in 2010 (except Mumbai). The satellite rights were bought by Sony TV group, while the music rights were bought by T-series/Big music.

Release
Kites was on 3000 screens in India, and across 30 countries and 500 screens globally, according to distributor Reliance BIG Entertainment. It opened on 208 screens in North America, making it the largest Bollywood release there to that time.

Promotion
To help promote the film, mini "music videos" were released online, each about one minute long and featuring a song from the soundtrack set against scenes from the film. The clothing brand Provogue, which features Hrithik Roshan as its brand ambassador, launched a Kites clothing range. A photo shoot regarding the campaign was shot in the Maldives, featuring Hrithik Roshan and Bárbara Mori.

International versions
While the Hindi version of Kites was released on 21 May 2010 in India, the international version was released one week later, on 28 May 2010. The film was scheduled to be released in over 60 countries.

Kites was released in a second international English-language version as Kites: The Remix, "Presented By" Brett Ratner, recut by his regular editor, Mark Helfrich, with new music by Graeme Revell using remix techniques developed in the series Kung Faux.

Reception

Critical reception
The film received an 80% positive rating on the film critics aggregate site Rotten Tomatoes from 25 reviews, with the consensus being, "Thoroughly overwrought in true Bollywood fashion, Kites is deeply flawed —and too effervescently charming to resist." The movie generally received mixed reviews in India. It had a score of 5/10 on the critics aggregate site Review Gang, based on 13 reviews. The chemistry of the lead actors and the cinematography were specifically praised by Indian critics Anupama Chopra and Raja Sen. Rajeev Masand of IBN said "Thrilling action set-pieces, a super-fluid dance number to show off Hrithik's killer moves, and repeated glimpses at the toned bodies of both lead stars. It's almost enough to forgive the uniformly bad acting of all supporting cast". Anupama Chopra of NDTV said "the film doesn't become more than the sum of its parts because the second half is flat and in places, outright foolish". Noyon Jyoti Parasara of AOL India stated, "It fails in the primary promise of a love story which surpasses language barriers," while Shubhra Gupta of Indian Express calls it "really old wine in a sort-of new bottle".

In the U.S., Jeannette Catsoulis of The New York Times called it "a lovers-on-the-lam blast of pure pulp escapism" that "caroms from car chase to shootout, from rain dancing to bank robbing with unflagging energy. It's all completely loony, but the stunts are impressive, the photography crisp and the leads so adorably besotted that audiences might as well check their cynicism at the door." Frank Lovece of Film Journal International said, "Bollywood enters telenovela territory in a hybrid film that takes the heightened emotions, wild tonal ranges and impeccably crisp technique of modern Hindi cinema and puts all that in the service of a tragic love story straight out of Mexican TV. ... As an old-style Hollywood romance in modern dress, it delivers what people say they want when they say, 'They don't make pictures like that anymore.'" Kevin Thomas of the Los Angeles Times said the film "draws from westerns, musicals, film noir [and] chase thrillers with stunts so preposterous they verge on parody – and it gets away with everything because of [director] Basu's visual bravura and unstinting passion and energy."

Box office

India
Box Office India said the film "opened to a bumper response at most places" in India, but noted "reports are not encouraging, the biggest reason for failure are being the film has a lot of English and Spanish dialogue." The film collected  net in its lifetime run in India.
It has 281 reviews and 4.6 rating on Amazon prime video.

Overseas
On its first weekend in the North America, the film opened in 208 theaters and ranked No. 10 in the box office, grossing $958,673. It was the first Bollywood movie to reach the weekend top ten, though My Name is Khan had a larger first-weekend North American gross, with $1.9 million at 120 theaters, reaching #13. Kites debuted at No. 10 in the UK, with an opening of £174,000 from 70 screens. Overall, the film was rated as a flop by Box Office India.

The film fared very poorly in the United Kingdom and earned £9,110 on 31 screens, with the per-screen average working out to £294. In the first week that both films were out together in the United States, Kites: The Remix did only one tenth of the business that the original Kites did, and less than half on a per-screen basis. Box Office Mojo shows that while the original Kites film was able to become the first ever original Bollywood created film to score in the "Top Ten" of the overall Hollywood Box office tally on its opening weekend, the Kites: The Remix hybrid version only managed to place 51st on its first weekend.

Awards and nominations
2011 Zee Cine Awards

Won
Best Cinematography - Ayananka Bose

Nominated
Best Female Debut - Bárbara Mori
Best Playback singer male — KK for "Zindagi Do Pal Ki"

2011 BIG Star Entertainment Awards

Nominated
Best Playback singer male — KK for "Zindagi Do Pal Ki"

2011 GIMA Awards

Nominated
Best Playback singer male — KK for "Zindagi Do Pal Ki"

Music

Kites music album was composed by Rajesh Roshan, with lyrics penned by Nasir Faraaz and Asif Ali Beg. The songs "Dil Kyon Yeh Mera" and "Zindagi Do Pal Ki" (both sung by KK) became a rage while other songs were also successful. Variety Magazine said the music "ranges from hip-hop to Enya-esque ululating." The movie's main romantic theme has been described as "identical in melody, key, and instrumentation to "Aníron" (Theme for Aragorn and Arwen), written by Enya for The Lord of the Rings: The Fellowship of the Ring", though Enya is not given any composer's credit for the music in Kites.

Kites: The Remix was almost completely re-scored with new music by Graeme Revell.

References

External links
 
 
 
 

2010 films
2010 action thriller films
2010s romantic thriller films
2010s chase films
Films set in the Las Vegas Valley
Films set in Mexico
Films shot in the Las Vegas Valley
Films shot in Los Angeles
Films shot in New Mexico
English-language Indian films
Films about interracial romance
Films scored by Rajesh Roshan
Reliance Entertainment films
2010 multilingual films
Films set in the United States
Films shot in the United States
American action thriller films
American romantic thriller films
American chase films
American multilingual films
Mexican thriller films
Films shot in Mexico
Films directed by Anurag Basu
Films about Mexican Americans
Hispanic and Latino American films
2010s English-language films
2010s American films